Still Standing is a Canadian television series, which premiered on CBC Television in summer 2015. The show's tagline slogan is "towns that are against the ropes but still hanging in there", reflecting the show's premise to tell the "story of small towns in Canada and how they overcome struggles". It is based on the Danish television series Gintberg på kanten (Gintberg on the edge).

A hybrid comedy and reality series, the program features actor and comedian Jonny Harris. In each episode, Harris travels to small Canadian communities  which are financially struggling but "still standing" and spends time getting to know the residents and their lifestyles. At the end of the trip, Harris performs a stand-up comedy show for the town's residents, into which he integrates some of his newfound insights about life in their community. In the television format, however, clips from the comedy show are interspersed throughout the episode rather than occurring specifically at the end. The show is produced by Frantic Films.

The show premiered on June 23, 2015, with an episode set in Bamfield, British Columbia.

Filming
To be considered for a show, a community must submit a proposal to the show's producers, who then select a subset of those proposals for inclusion in that season's programming. The order of filming is independent of the order of episode broadcasting. Filming occurs during the three hiatuses in the filming of Murdoch Mysteries, in which Harris is part of the main cast.

A producer visits the town before the filming crew arrives to become familiar with the community. The crew then spends five days in the community, the first four of which are spent filming scenery and conducting interviews. Most of the segments are planned in advance, including Harris interviewing local individuals. The filming schedule is flexible to allow the crew to film events "on the fly". The crew consists of 10 to 16 members who are billeted during the filming.

Comedy show
The visit culminates in a comedy performance by Harris at a local venue on the fifth day. The event is free to attend on a first come, first served basis, and features performances by other stand-up comics. In the show, Harris discusses the residents, and the community's difficulties and response to those difficulties. Harris said he was "worried that they (local residents) might be apprehensive" about the show and its subject, but found that instead "they were laid back". He stated that "people are not overly sensitive, and are just up for the laugh".

The stand-up routine typically includes inside jokes that may not be included in the episode that is broadcast.

Episodes

Series overview

Season 1 (2015)

Season 2 (2016)

Season 3 (2017)

Season 4 (2018)

Season 5 (2019)

Season 6 (2020)

Season 7 (2022) 
Filming for the seventh season was delayed because of the COVID-19 pandemic in Canada. As a result of the ongoing pandemic, filming followed screening tests and other protocols, and during the show guests were seated in physically separated cohorts. After the show, Harris did not meet with the guests as he had done in previous seasons.

Ten episodes were made for season 7.

Season 8 (2023)
The eighth season of the show will consist of 10 episodes broadcast during winter 2023.

Broadcast 
The series is available on Tubi, Amazon Prime, and The Roku Channel in the US. Seasons 6 and 7 were released exclusively on Tubi in April 2022. The series is also available on Pluto TV in the US.

Reception
Television critic John Doyle, writing in The Globe and Mail, stated that Harris is "extremely good at connecting with the local people".

Awards

Canadian Screen Awards

See also 
 Rick Mercer Report

References

Notes

External links
 
 

2015 Canadian television series debuts
CBC Television original programming
2010s Canadian comedy television series
2010s Canadian reality television series
2020s Canadian comedy television series
2020s Canadian reality television series